Pyrgidium is a genus of fungi within the Sphinctrinaceae family.

References

External links
Index Fungorum

Eurotiomycetes genera
Taxa named by William Nylander (botanist)
Eurotiomycetes